Thomas Edwin Ashbridge (1890–1964) was an English association footballer. He played as an inside forward for Wallsend, Watford and Sheffield United. During his sole season at Watford, he finished as the club's top scorer with 14 goals in all competitions. This tally included 5 goals in a 10–0 FA Cup win over Bournemouth F.C. on 29 November 1913, which remains the Watford record for the most goals scored by one player in the competition.

Due to financial constraints, Watford sold Ashbridge to Sheffield United for £350, with his team-mate Harry Pantling making a similar move. However, Ashbridge was not able to establish himself in United's team. He left at the end of the 1914–15 season, coinciding with the suspension of competitive football due to the First World War.

References

1890 births
1964 deaths
People from Maryport
Association football forwards
Southern Football League players
Wallsend F.C. players
Watford F.C. players
Sheffield United F.C. players
English footballers
Footballers from Cumbria